Time Out for Lessons is a 1939 Our Gang short comedy film directed by Edward Cahn.  It was the 185th Our Gang short (186th episode, 97th talking short, 98th talking episode, and 17th MGM produced episode) that was released.

Plot
Afalfa is preparing for a Football game with the gang before his father takes him aside to talk about his poor grades, Alfalfa is told that, he has a lot of Grade "D" on his tests and unless he improves his academic standing, he'll never get to college. Alfalfa responds, "Don't 'D' stand for 'Dandy'?" He then informs his father that he intends to sail through college on a football scholarship. His father then puts forth an illustration to Alfalfa who imagines that he is a student at "Hale University" (a spoof of Yale University) and that he is a big football star with poor grades. During his dream about future gridiron triumphs, Alfalfa is brought down to earth when he envisions himself being disqualified by his professor from the inevitable "big game" due to his lousy grades. After picturing this scenario our hero vows to put football on the back burner in favor of cracking the books.  His father though encourages him to balance them out and not neglect one for the other, so while Alfalfa doesn't give up Football he promises and encourages the gang to take "Time Out For Lessons".

Cast

The Gang
 Carl Switzer as Alfalfa
 Mickey Gubitosi as Mickey
 Darla Hood as Darla
 George McFarland as Spanky
 Billie Thomas as Buckwheat
 Shirley Coates as Muggsy
 Darwood Kaye as Waldo
 Leonard Landy as Leonard

Additional cast
 Gloria Brown as Spanky's dance partners
 Hugh Chapman as Kid encouraging Leonard
 Paul Hilton as Roommate
 Dickie Humphries as Kid encouraging Buckwheat
 Valerie Lee as Mickey's dance partner
 Si Wills as Alfalfa's father

College extras
Joe "Corky" Geil, James Gubitosi, Jovanni Gubitosi, Janice Hood, Jackie Horner, Payne Johnson, Larry Kert, Sidney Kibrick, Rae-Nell Laskey, Gerald Mackey, Tommy McFarland, Glenn Mickens, Priscilla Montgomery, Betty Ann Muir, Jo-Jo La Savio, Harold Switzer

Notes
The film is one of many MGM Our Gang episodes about teaching a lesson to children. The series continues to head downhill with one morality lesson after another. Soon, World War II propaganda will be a subject of many Our Gang episodes.
The film was the last appearance of Sidney Kibrick. He was initially a background character while his older brother Leonard was the gang bully. After his brother leaves, Sidney is teamed up with a new bully, Butch, played by Tommy Bond. Sidney becomes known as "Woim". His last episode as Butch's sidekick had been Captain Spanky's Showboat.
Features an instrumental version of "The Jitterbug", a song written (but removed) from The Wizard of Oz.

See also
 Our Gang filmography

References

External links

1939 films
American black-and-white films
1939 comedy films
Films directed by Edward L. Cahn
Metro-Goldwyn-Mayer short films
Our Gang films
1939 short films
1930s American films
1930s English-language films